The 1980 European Wrestling Championships  was held from 20 to 27 April 1980 in Prievidza, Czechoslovakia.

Medal table

Medal summary

Men's freestyle

Men's Greco-Roman

References

External links
Fila's official championship website

Europe
W
European Wrestling Championships
Euro
Sport in Trenčín Region
1980 in European sport